Jean-Jacques Dordain (born 14 April 1946) was Director General of the European Space Agency between 2003 and 2015.

Graduating at École Centrale Paris in 1968, Dordain began his scientific career in the French Aerospace Research Agency (ONERA) and later worked as a professor at the National Higher School of Aeronautics and Aerospace in the 1970s and 1980s. He has conducted extensive research in rocket engines and microgravity experiments. He was also a European astronaut candidate.

In 1998 he was Executive Secretary at the Japanese Space Agency (then NASDA, now JAXA) and later started as Director of Launchers at ESA, where he became Director General in July 2003.

He also holds the honorary function of Chancellor of the International Space University.

On 1 July 2015, he was succeeded as Director General of the ESA by Johann-Dietrich Woerner of Germany.

In 2019, Dordain was elected as a member into the National Academy of Engineering for contributions to complex space systems and leadership of space exploration programs worldwide.

References

External links
Spacefacts biography of Jean-Jacques Dordain

1946 births
Living people
French businesspeople
European Space Agency personnel
École Centrale Paris alumni